DW2 may refer to:

Digimon World 2
Dragon Warrior II
Dynasty Warriors 2